Pirates of Malaya (Italian: I pirati della Malesia) is a 1941 Italian historical adventure film directed by Enrico Guazzoni and starring Massimo Girotti, Clara Calamai and Camillo Pilotto.

It is based on Emilio Salgari's 1896 novel The Pirates of Malaysia. It was shot at the Cinecittà Studios in Rome back to back with The Two Tigers, of which it is the sequel. The film's sets were designed by the art director Alfredo Montori. The same novel was later adapted by Umberto Lenzi for the 1964 film Pirates of Malaysia.

Cast 
Massimo Girotti as Tremal-Naik
Clara Calamai as Ada
Camillo Pilotto as Kammamuri
Luigi Pavese as Sandokan
Sandro Ruffini as Janez
Greta Gonda as Baroness van Zeeland
Nino Pavese as Lord Brooke
Anita Farra as La taverniera 
 Cesare Fantoni as Sujodana 
 Enzo Gerio as Aghur 
 Zara Lammarì as La danzatrice indiana 
 Carlo Ludovici as Hassim 
 Oreste Onorato as Sambigliong 
 Aldo Pini as Namur 
 Valeria Roberti as Melahia 
 Otello Toso as Il tenente Schmidt

See also 
 Sandokan

References

External links

1940s historical adventure films
Italian historical adventure films
Films based on the Indo-Malaysian cycle
Films directed by Enrico Guazzoni
Films set in Malaysia
Films set in the 19th century
Films shot at Cinecittà Studios
1941 films
1940s Italian-language films
Italian black-and-white films
1940s Italian films